The Sharpless oxyamination (often known as Sharpless aminohydroxylation) is the chemical reaction that converts an alkene to a vicinal amino alcohol.  The reaction is related to the Sharpless dihydroxylation, which converts alkenes to vicinal diols. Vicinal amino-alcohols are important products in organic synthesis and recurring pharmacophores in drug discovery.

Mechanism
Akin to the dihydroxylation, the oxyamination involves the cycloaddition of the alkene to an imido Os(VIII) intermediate of the type OsO3(NR).  Such species are generated by treatment of osmium tetroxide with the sodium chloramines.  Typical procedures combine chloramine-T, alkene, an osmium catalyst, and a chiral ligand. Related procedures use benzyl carbamate (CbzNH2), sodium hydroxide, tert-butyl hypochlorite to give CbzNCl(Na).
R2NH + t-BuOCl → R2NCl + t-BuOH

Further reading
Early papers in the development of this methodology.
Sharpless, K. B.; Patrick, D. W.; Truesdale, L. K.; Biller, S. A. J. Am. Chem. Soc. 1975, 97, 2305.
Herranz, E.; Biller, S. A.; Sharpless, K. B. J. Am. Chem. Soc. 1978, 100, 3596-3598.
Bäckvall, J. E.; Oshima, K.; Palermo, R. E.; Sharpless, K. B. J. Org. Chem. 1979, 44, 1953.

References

Organic redox reactions
Name reactions